Edenwood, also known as the Smith-Williams House, is a historic home located near Garner, Wake County, North Carolina.  The original section of the house dates to the early-19th century.  About 1850, a frame Greek Revival-style I-house was added. A two-story frame wing was added about 1935.  A center-bay two-story pedimented porch flanked by one-story, full-facade, attached porches were added to the front facade in the 1930s.  Also on the property is a contributing outbuilding.

It was listed on the National Register of Historic Places in 1993.

References

Houses on the National Register of Historic Places in North Carolina
Greek Revival houses in North Carolina
Colonial Revival architecture in North Carolina
Houses completed in 1850
Houses in Wake County, North Carolina
National Register of Historic Places in Wake County, North Carolina